Hasanparthi Road railway station (station code:HSP) is located at Hasanparthy in Warangal, Telangana. 

It is under the administration of South Central Railway zone , Indian Railway. 

 and  railway station are the nearby railway station.

References

Railway stations in Hanamkonda district
Transport in Warangal